A whoopee (or whoopie) cushion is a practical joke device involving flatulence humour, which produces a noise resembling human flatulence. It has also been referred to as a farting bag, pooting cushion, windy blaster and Razzberry Cushion.

History and modern usage
The whoopee cushion has reportedly been used since ancient times. Roman Emperor Elagabalus was said to enjoy practical jokes at his dinner parties and often placed whoopee cushions under the chairs of his more pompous guests. The 10th-century Aghlabid emir of Ifriqiya, Ziyadat Allah III, is said to have enjoyed hiding inflated animal bladders under the cushions of his palace for unsuspecting guests to sit on.

The modern rubber version was invented in the 1930s by the JEM Rubber Co. of Toronto, Ontario, Canada, by employees who were experimenting with scrap sheets of rubber. The company's owner approached Samuel Sorenson Adams, inventor of numerous practical jokes and owner of S.S. Adams Co., with the newly invented item; however, Adams thought that it was "too vulgar" and would never sell. JEM then offered the idea to the Johnson Smith Company, which sold it with great success. Adams later released its own version, calling it the Razzberry Cushion.

Design

The device is made from two sheets of rubber that are glued together at the edges, with a small flap opening at one end for air to enter and exit. Whoopee cushions lack durability and can break easily, lasting longest when they are not inflated or sat on with excessive force.

Usage

Standard whoopie cushions are inflated by blowing into the flapped opening. "Self-inflating" cushions have an interior sponge that keeps them in a normally expanded state, and do not require inflation. 

The cushion is then placed on a chair and covered with a seat cushion or other material, so that an unsuspecting "victim" may sit on it, forcing the air out of it, causing the flap to vibrate and creating a loud, farting-like sound. 

If the "victim" happens to sit on the opening, blocking the air flow, it can rupture the cushion instead. For this reason, some pranksters place the cushion so the opening extends toward the front of the chair, where it is less likely to be sat on. However, this can make the cushion more conspicuous.

Alternatively, the cushion can be inflated and intentionally operated by hand to produce the noise.

A similar noise can be made by inflating a toy balloon, then releasing the opening and letting it deflate. The escaping air causes the opening to vibrate and make noise as the balloon is propelled away.

See also
 List of inflatable manufactured goods
 List of practical joke topics

References

Canadian inventions
Practical joke devices
Flatulence humor
Inflatable manufactured goods